Evie Irie (born December 2002) is an Australian pop singer and songwriter from the Central Coast, New South Wales. She released her debut extended play 5 Weeks in LA in 2019 through Republic Records, after travelling to the United States to pursue becoming a singer. In 2020, she released the EPs The Optimist and The Pessimist, she also collaborated with producer Dillon Francis on the song  "Be Somebody", and Her most recent single "Bleed"

Life and career 

Irie grew up on the Central Coast, to the north of Sydney, Australia. From a young age she performed in cafés and restaurants around her home town, and began writing songs at 12. Finding her own life dull, Irie drew inspiration from the stories her older sister told her of her teenage life. At a time when many of her friends were going on exchange programs when Irie was 15, she decided instead to spend a year in the United States to develop herself as a singer and songwriter and find connections in the music industry, travelling to Los Angeles, New York City and Nashville.

Irie wrote her first extended play during a five-week period visiting Los Angeles. After finding more inspiration than she expected (having planned to stay for only a single week, but extended her stay after her father was impressed at the songs), Irie continued to write and network. By the end of the five weeks, Irie had been signed to major label Republic Records. The EP was released in mid-2019, after which she spent time touring with Norwegian singer Sigrid and British band Bastille. Her second EP, The Optimist, was released in September 2020, quickly followed by a companion EP entitled The Pessimist in November. In the same month, Irie collaborated with Dillon Francis on the single "Be Somebody".

Personal life
Irie has two sisters. She experiences a small degree of synesthesia, experiencing colours when she listens to music.

Industry

Evie is managed by Troy Carter, and signed in 2019 with  Downtown Music Publishing.

Discography

Extended plays

Singles

As featured artist

References

2002 births
21st-century Australian women singers
21st-century Australian singers
Australian women pop singers
Australian singer-songwriters
Living people
Republic Records artists
People from the Central Coast (New South Wales)
Singers from New South Wales
Date of birth missing (living people)